Sphingomyelin deacylase (SM deacylase, GcSM deacylase, glucosylceramide sphingomyelin deacylase, sphingomyelin glucosylceramide deacylase, SM glucosylceramide GCer deacylase, SM-GCer deacylase, SMGCer deacylase) is an enzyme with systematic name N-acyl-sphingosylphosphorylcholine amidohydrolase. This enzyme catalyses the following chemical reaction

 (1) an N-acyl-sphingosylphosphorylcholine + H2O  a fatty acid + sphingosylphosphorylcholine;; 
 (2) a D-glucosyl-N-acylsphingosine + H2O  a fatty acid + D-glucosyl-sphingosine

The enzyme is involved in the sphingolipid metabolism in the epidermis.

References

External links 
 

EC 3.5.1